Vignan Institute of Technology and Management (also called VITAM Berhampur and in ) is an engineering college located in Berhampur, in southern Odisha, India. Established in 2009 by Naveen Patnaik, the then  chief minister of Odisha, the college has one academic building and one workshop. It is a constituent college of Biju Patnaik University of Technology (BPUT). This college was named after the King Krushna Chandra Gajapati, the creator of modern Odisha.

Academic structure 
The college provides 4 years Bachelor of Technology degrees in 6 disciplines[3] of engineering: Civil Engineering, Computer Science Engineering,  Electronics and Telecommunication Engineering, Mechanical Engineering and Electrical and Electronics Engineering and Applied Electronics and Instrumentation Engineering. A three-year B.Tech degree for diploma holders as lateral entries is also offered. All courses are full-time. The college also provides 2 years Master of Technology degrees in 2 specializations: Machine Design and ETCE and also Master of Business Administration degree

Each academic year consists of two semesters and a summer term. The education system is organized around a credit system, which ensures continuous evaluation of a student's performance and provides flexibility to choose courses to suit the student's ability or convenience. Each course is assigned credits depending upon the class hours.

Affiliation 
VITAM is the Life Member International Accreditation Organization (IAO) Houston U.S.A and VITAM is having GoL MOU with Glewford University (U.S.A) ( faculty and student exchange Programmes).

VITAM is  an ISO 9001:2015 self funded Technology and Management Institute .[3]

Admission 
Intake into different degree courses in this institute is made only through a "Joint Entrance Examination" conducted each year by the government of Odisha.This year ojee sought its admission through jee-main previously known as "AIEEE". The details of the eligibility, reservation, medical requirements, procedure for admission etc. are given as per the information brochure of "OJEE"-2015.

Placements 
The college has year on year excellent placements. In the placement season 2014–15, the highest salary package had been Rs 3.2 Lakhs per annum(lpa) offered to 5 students by TCS through off campus placements and rest of students are in good position. Although looking to the placement is not as per expectation but the pass out batches of 2013 and 2014 students are well placed in top MNC like IBM, TCS, COGNIZANT, CAPGEMINI, INFOSYS, ACCENTURE, ARICENT and also in various public service like barc, hal and most of the student pursuing their mtech studies in various IITs, and NITs.../
But nowadays no placement available

Examination 
Registration is required at the beginning of each semester. Students are allowed to appear for examination for registered courses only, and should consult with the respective department heads for guidance before registration. Students are eligible to appear for examinations provided they attend a minimum of 75% of their theory, practical, and sessional classes scheduled during the semester.

Departments 
Four existing branches and three new branches are offered by B.TECH:

An additional department of Basic Science and Humanities is available. This department includes Mathematics, Physics, Chemistry, English, Economics and Management.

References

Engineering colleges in Odisha
Colleges affiliated with Biju Patnaik University of Technology
Education in Berhampur
Educational institutions established in 2009
2009 establishments in Orissa